Nass is an Arabic word variously translated as "a known, clear legal injunction," a "divine decree", a "designation", "written law" as opposed to unwritten law,  "canonical text" that forbids or requires,
a "textual proof".

In Shiah Islam (Twelver and Isma'ili), nass refers specifically to the designation of an infallible Imam by a previous infallible Imam.

References

Twelver theology
Islamic terminology
Ismailism

fa:نص